Conrad Stucheli (born 1892, date of death unknown) was a Swiss sports shooter. He competed in two events at the 1924 Summer Olympics.

References

External links
 

1892 births
Year of death missing
Swiss male sport shooters
Olympic shooters of Switzerland
Shooters at the 1924 Summer Olympics
Place of birth missing